When It Falls is the second album by Zero 7, released on 1 March 2004.

The album features vocals by Sia (on tracks "Somersault" and "Speed Dial No.2"), Mozez (on "Warm Sound", "Over Our Heads" and "Morning Song"), Sophie Barker (on "Passing By" and "In Time") and Tina Dico (on "Home" and "The Space Between").

Track listing

Singles
The following singles were released from the album:

External links 
 
BBC review

References

Zero 7 albums
2004 albums
Contemporary R&B albums by English artists